VIVA (abbreviation for:  translating to "Video Exploitation Facility") was a German free-to-air music television channel, first broadcast on 1 December 1993. The channel was intended to compete against MTV Europe and was the first German-language music TV channel, while MTV was only broadcast in English until the introduction of MTV Germany in 1997. It was also supposed to focus more on German music and pop culture while MTV only broadcast anglophone music by artists mostly from North America, the United Kingdom, Ireland and Australia.

After years of competition for audience share, MTV Networks Europe eventually acquired VIVA on 14 January 2005, after it had outrun its own efforts for better ratings. MTV operated VIVA channels in Austria, Germany, Hungary, Ireland, Poland, Switzerland and the United Kingdom.

In June 2018, Viacom announced that it would shut down all Viva operations worldwide at the end of 2018.

The channel ceased to broadcast at 14:00 on 31 December 2018, being replaced by Comedy Central.

History

Initial concept 

The concept behind VIVA originated in 1992, when major record labels were frustrated by MTV Europe's decision to program mostly English-language music videos to the Germanophone markets, in what was perceived as its refusal to play major German-speaking artists. Executives at US media giant Time Warner, keen on increasing their market share of its music repertoire and business in Germany, planned the new TV station in 1992. Eventually, they recruited DoRo Productions, producers of music videos for notable acts such as Queen, The Rolling Stones, David Bowie, in the design of the music channel. Time Warner executives Tom McGrath and Peter Bogner assembled a group of record labels that included its very own Warner Music, EMI Music, Polygram Records and Sony Television along with Frank Otto, Apax Partners, and Austrian producers Rudi Dolezal and Hannes Rossacher of DoRo Productions. In a concept paper of Time Warner, Peter Bogner analyzed MTV's market position as vulnerable, and "while MTV is betting on a diet of pure Anglo-American video clips, VIVA should broadcast at least 40% more German music."

VIVA became an immediate success with the audience, while ultimately providing German artists with a music channel that could help expose their music to the German audience.

Competing with MTV 

With Dieter Gorny eventually as its second managing director on board, VIVA applied for cable carriage licenses in the various German states. DoRo Productions designed the original programming format which while clearly a music video channel, sought to differentiate itself from MTV not just by having a German-speaking voice, but by speaking directly to the differences in pop culture between Germany and the anglophone MTV.

Before launching the channel, the labels offered to fund MTV in a German-speaking version but were rejected by MTV management at the time, as it espoused a "one world, one language" programming philosophy (at least for Europe since the Latin American channels used Spanish and Portuguese).

On 21 March 1995, a second channel, Viva Zwei ("VIVA Two"), was created, initially a channel for classic music videos which later focused on lesser known and more independently produced music, mostly indie and alternative rock, metal, electronic music and alternative hip hop.

However, Viva Zwei was not financially successful, so on 7 January 2002, it was replaced by VIVA Plus, a channel dedicated purely to pop and mainstream music for a younger target audience. Some Viva Zwei formats managed to continue on Viva Plus for some time though, and Fast Forward even got included in the main channel's program. VIVA Plus itself was discontinued on 14 January 2007 and got replaced by Comedy Central Deutschland the next day.

Comet Awards 

Since 1995, VIVA held an annual pop music award ceremony known as the Comet. During the 2003 award ceremonies, VIVA openly expressed an anti-Iraq War view. The awards were last held in 2011. The 2012 awards ceremony was cancelled as Viacom wanted to focus more on the MTV Europe Music Awards instead. In 2013, it got cancelled again. Although the awards were never officially canceled altogether, they weren't held ever since.

MTV's response to VIVA 

After MTV introduced a German-language version of itself in 1997, the competition between the two stations increased. VIVA was widely perceived as the more mainstream-oriented channel for younger viewers, while MTV Germany was directed at youths and young adults with some edgier programming. In 2003, VIVA got bad press after it was discovered that it had given Universal Music an unfair advantage in the placement of their music videos.

MTV owner acquires VIVA 

In 2004, VIVA was acquired by Viacom International, which also owns MTV, thus ending the rivalry between VIVA and MTV and making them start to cooperate instead. After the acquisition of VIVA by Viacom, MTV Germany shifted to mostly broadcasting reality and comedy shows. VIVA became the music channel with chart shows and other similar programs which were mostly directed at a mainstream audience. Viacom introduced a programming scheme that allowed the station to be run by just 40 people, making many previous employees redundant.  The studios and headquarters in Cologne were closed in March 2005, from then on VIVA broadcast from the same studios as MTV Germany in Berlin.

From January 2011, under a major shakeup at MTV Networks Germany, VIVA continued to be part of MTV Networks Germany's free-to-air package and the channel became the main music and entertainment brand within Germany while complemented by its sister channels MTV Germany and MTV Brand New, which then became pay TV, although in late 2017 MTV Germany was put back into free TV. VIVA Germany received a new look and on-air branding on 1 January 2011. The new look of VIVA joined the four triangles of the new logo into one triangle, putting the angle of VIVA into one heart.

Starting 22 March 2011, VIVA broadcast only in 16:9. Programs produced in 4:3 were cropped to 14:9 and black bars were added left and right. VIVA HD Germany, a simulcast in 1080i high-definition, launched on 16 May 2011. It was available via IPTV from Deutsche Telekom.

Discontinuation 
In June 2018, Viacom announced its decision to discontinue VIVA at the end of 2018. Viacom general manager Mark Specht said in an interview that the channel is profitable, but that Viacom wants to focus on its three core brands MTV, Comedy Central and Nickelodeon as it sees bigger growth opportunities there. The slot will be filled by Comedy Central, which had already shared its slot with VIVA since 2014 and after the end of VIVA will become a 24-hour channel after so far has been only broadcast in the evening and night hours while VIVA was broadcast at daytime.

On 31 December 2018 at 14:00 CET, the channel aired its final music video, "Viva Forever", by the Spice Girls, which had also been aired when sister channel in the UK and Ireland ceased broadcast earlier in the year. Shortly after, the channel aired a farewell bumper, featuring several music artists, former hosts and other celebrities (including DJ BoBo, Loona, Alex Christensen, Udo Lindenberg and Oliver Pocher) saying their goodbyes. After the bumper ended, the channel aired the music video of "Zu geil für diese Welt" by Die Fantastischen Vier (which was also the first music video that was aired back in 1993) and then faded into a black screen featuring the old 2002-2004 VIVA logo with the words "Rest In Peace" and "1993-2018" below. Shortly after, the channel faded to dark, followed by the startup of Comedy Central, ending 25 years of broadcast. The broadcast was "extended", as in the first seconds of Comedy Central broadcast, the station failed to switch off the VIVA logo.

Programming 

 #Facebookclips
 #Tweetclips
 10 Dinge, die ich an dir hasse
 180°
 Alle hassen Chris
 American Dad!
 Aqua Teen Hunger Force
 Archer
 Awkward – Mein sogenanntes Leben
 Beavis and Butt-head
 Blue Mountain State
 Britney and Kevin: Chaotic
 Bully Beatdown
 Catfish – Verliebte im Netz
 Promi-Deathmatch
 Crash Canyon
 Criss Angel Mindfreak
 Die Pinguine aus Madasgcar
 Die Ren & Stimpy Show
 Death Valley
 Degrassi
 Deutschstunde
 Unglücksdatum
 Detektiv Conan
 Drawn Together
 Eure VIVA Lieblingsklicks 
 Family Guy
 Feat.
 Faust des Zen
 Flash Prank
 Friendzone
 Futurama
 Game One
 Get the Clip
 Riesig
 Glee
 Geordie Shore
 Good Morning Saturday 
 Good Morning Sunday
 Guy Code
 Jungs mit Kindern
 Happy End
 Happy Tree Friends
 Hollys Welt
 InuYasha: Ein feudales Märchen
 Ich war mal dick
 Jackass
 Jersey Shore
 Keeping Up with the Kardashians
 Kendra
 Kenny gegen Spenny
 Ke$ha: Mein verrücktes schönes Leben
 Killer-Karaoke
 Liebe oder nicht
 Love Test 3 in 1
 Loveline
 Made
 Melissa und Joey
 Mixery Massive Music
 Most Wanted 2000s
 MTV at the Movies
 MTV Europe Music Awards
 MTV Home
 MTV Movie Awards
 MTV Top 100 (previously until December 2017 as VIVA Top 100)
 MTV Unplugged
 MTV Video Music Awards
 MTV World Stage
 Music
 My Kid is Gonna Be Famous
 Meine super süße Weltklasse
 Mein Leben als Liz
 Naruto
 Neu
 Neu um 9
 Night Sounds
 Night Sounds Party (at weekend instead of Night sounds) 
 Nitrozirkus
 O.C., Kalifornien
 One Piece
 One Tree Hill
 Party, Bruder!
 Pimp My Ride
 Plain Jane
 Streichelte
 Versuchsgelände
 Punk'd
 Echte Männer von Hollywood
 Retro Charts
 Ridiculousness
 Robot Chicken
 Unhöfliches Rohr
 Sailor Moon
 Savage U
 Scandalicious
 Narben
 Skins
 SMS Guru
 Snooki & JWoww
 Special Charts
 SpongeBob Schwammkopf
 Style Star
 Supercharts
 Teen Mom 2
 The Dudesons in America
 The Hard Times of RJ Berger
 The Hasselhoffs
 Then and Now
 The Pauly D Project
 The Short List
 Todd und das Buch des Bösen
 Tsubasa: Reservoir Chronik
 Ugly Americans
 Undateable
 Underemployed
 VIVA Charts … 1 Year Ago
 VIVA Charts … 5 Years Ago
 VIVA Club Rotation
 VIVA Comet
 VIVA Fahrstuhlmusik
 VIVA Live!
 VIVAs Most Played Charts
 VIVAs Most Wanted Charts
 VIVApedia
 VIVA Quiz
 VIVA Sounds
 VIVA Spezial
 VIVA Streaming Charts
 VIVA Top 20 Singlecharts
 VIVA Top 40 Singlecharts
 VIVA Top 100
 VIVA Wecker
 Your Choice
 Supercharts
 South Park
 Archer
 WakeBrothers
 Young & Married
 Zoey 101

Presenters

Presenters from MTV

Logos 

Note that from 1 December 2018 to 31 December 2018 all logo designs of Viva were shown by changing every two minutes, as a tribute to Viva due to its shut down.

VIVA in other countries 
Viacom also operated VIVA channels in Austria (VIVA Austria), Hungary (VIVA Hungary), Poland (VIVA Polska), The United Kingdom and Ireland (Viva UK and Ireland) and Switzerland (VIVA Switzerland).

See also 
 TMF, a similar defunct channel to VIVA that was available in the Netherlands and Flemish speaking parts of Belgium before being replaced by localized versions of MTV. Both VIVA and TMF are operated by Viacom International Media Networks Europe.
 Viva Zwei

References

External links 
 VIVA Website for Germany, Austria and Switzerland
  website of Viacom International Media Networks Germany
  report in Die Welt about the planned massive reduction of staff in VIVA

1993 establishments in Germany
2018 disestablishments in Germany
Television channels and stations established in 1993
Television channels and stations disestablished in 2018
Television stations in Berlin
Defunct television channels in Germany
VIVA (TV station)
Music organisations based in Germany